Invicta is an early steam locomotive, built by Robert Stephenson and Company in Newcastle-upon-Tyne during 1829. She was the twentieth locomotive built by railway engineers the Stephensons, being constructed immediately after Rocket. Invicta marked the end of the first phase of locomotive design, which had started with Richard Trevithick's Coalbrookdale locomotive of 1802.

Invicta hauled its first train on the Canterbury and Whitstable Railway on 30 May 1830, which was also the first steam-powered passenger service on the railway. Invicta remained in active service until 1839, when stationary engines were introduced to pull trains. Following a failed attempt to sell the locomotive, she was placed in storage. The stored ‘’Invicta’’ became the property of the South Eastern Railway during the 1840s, and was moved to Ashford Works, becoming the first locomotive in the world to be preserved.

Invicta was put on display and  appeared at various events in the UK and abroad. She was restored in 1892, and in 1906, Invicta was presented to the city of Canterbury by the South Eastern and Chatham Railway. For 70 years, Invicta was on static display in Canterbury. In 1977, a full cosmetic restoration of the locomotive was undertaken with help from the National Railway Museum. Presently, Invicta is owned by the Transport Trust. During November 2008, it was announced that a £41,000 Heritage Lottery Fund grant had been made to Canterbury City Council to develop a new museum at Whitstable to house Invicta. The extension was completed in 2019, and Invicta was lifted in to its new home on 16 June 2019.

History

Construction
The Canterbury and Whitstable Railway ordered a single locomotive from Robert Stephenson & Co in 1829, and construction of ‘’Invicta’’ started that year at Stephenson's Forth Street works in Newcastle upon Tyne. The locomotive's name comes from the Invicta motto on the Flag of Kent and means ‘’undefeated’’. Invicta was probably designed by Robert Stephenson, in consultation with his father George Stephenson. Invicta shares several features with Stephenson's Rocket, which was completed in 1829 at the same factory. Both have inclined cylinders set on the sides of the boiler, but on Invicta the cylinders are at the front, with connecting rods driving the rear wheels, and coupling rods driving the front wheels.

The original fire-tube boiler had 25 tubes of  diameter. The construction of Invicta cost £635.
 
The locomotive, excluding her tender, was 6 tons 5 cwt and she produced . Contemporary illustrations show that Invicta was originally equipped with a single-axle tender, which has not survived. The major controls, including the regulator are located about halfway along the boiler's left-hand side. She was operated by a driver, who stood upon on a timber footboard mounted above the locomotive's rear wheel, (as on Locomotion No. 1), and a fireman who stood in the tender.

Operational life
Upon completion, she departed the factory on 15 April 1830, being shipped by sea from Newcastle to Whitstable. On 30 May 1830, ‘’Invicta’’ hauled the inaugural train of the Canterbury and Whitstable Railway into Whitstable Harbour station. For this maiden journey, the locomotive was driven by Edward Fletcher, who later became the locomotive superintendent of the North Eastern Railway. ‘’Invicta’’ was the sole locomotive to be used on the line at the time of its opening.

Initial operations using ‘’Invicta’’ saw it routed along the northern two miles of the Canterbury & Whitstable line; however, it soon became apparent that the locomotive lacked the power at any speed to haul trains up the steep incline along Church Street when departing Whitstable. An alternative working practice was adopted to address this power shortage, starting in 1832; instead, trains were pulled up the incline using a stationary engine, which was reportedly capable of generating up to 11.2 kW, that was positioned at the top of the slope, while ‘’Invicta’’ was restricted to work the 1.6 km of track at South Street, which was relatively level.

During 1836, it was decided to perform a number of design modifications to ‘’Invicta’’. These involved the addition of another ring section to the boiler in place of the firebox, and the replacement of the original multi-tube boiler with a single flue boiler; this last change proved to be a retrograde step, even by that time, it had been generally accepted that multi-tube boilers were in fact more efficient than their single-tube counterparts. Reportedly, these changes had a negative impact on the locomotive's performance, often failing to produce a sufficient head of steam as to allow ‘’Invicta’’ to perform the services desired of it. Largely as a result of this failure, the locomotive's service life following these modifications can be described as being brief at best.

Preservation 

During 1839, Invicta was withdrawn from use upon the Canterbury and Whitstable Railway as a consequence of the decision to concentrate on using stationary engines for pulling trains instead, which had proved to be both adequate for the line's working and less troubled by a lack of power as the locomotive had been. While she was offered for sale by the company in October 1839, no buyer was ultimately found for it. As a result, Invicta was instead put under cover at  station. She came into the ownership of the South Eastern Railway in 1844 and was soon relocated to Ashford Works, minus her original two-wheeled tender. She was thus the first locomotive to be preserved; over the following years, she began to serve as a physical marker of the pioneering days of rail travel. During 1875, Invicta was exhibited at the Golden Jubilee of the Stockton and Darlington Railway; she also made an appearance at the Newcastle Stephenson Centenary in 1881.

During 1892, it is believed that work was begun upon its restoration; few details on this process are known. Subsequently, Invicta was exhibited at the Exposition Universelle in Paris, France, in 1900. In 1906, Invicta was presented to the city of Canterbury by David Lionel Goldsmid-Stern-Salomons, a director of the South Eastern and Chatham Railway. For 70 years, Invicta was put on static display in the Dane John Gardens, Canterbury. At some point during this time, it is believed that she was given a red coat of paint. It was not until 1977 that a full cosmetic restoration of the locomotive was undertaken, with help from the National Railway Museum, where she was transported by road. This work included her ironwork being painted black and the installation of timber cladding around the boiler barrel. Following the completion of this restoration, Invicta returned to Canterbury in time for the 150th anniversary of the Canterbury & Whitstable Railway on 3 May 1980.

Presently, the cosmetically restored Invicta is owned by the Transport Trust; it had been loaned for many years to the Canterbury Heritage Museum, where it had been on display prior to the museum's closure in 2017. During November 2008, it was announced that a £41,000 Heritage Lottery Fund planning grant had been made to Canterbury City Council to develop a new museum at Whitstable to house Invicta, as well as a stationary winding engine that was built at Robert Stephenson's works. In the months after Canterbury Heritage Museum closed down, the long term residence of Invicta was a topic of considerable debate, during which numerous museums petitioned to have it in their collections. Invicta was lifted in to its new home at the Whitstable Museum and Gallery on 16 June 2019.

References

External links

 "Invicta steam locomotive, 1830 - Science & Society Image Library."

Individual locomotives of Great Britain
Early steam locomotives
Preserved steam locomotives of Great Britain
City of Canterbury
Standard gauge steam locomotives of Great Britain
Robert Stephenson and Company locomotives
0-4-0 locomotives